I Told You I Was Trouble: Live in London is a live concert video by English singer and songwriter Amy Winehouse, released on DVD and Blu-ray on 5 November 2007 by Island Records. It was filmed on 29 May 2007 at The Shepherd's Bush Empire in London. On 11 December 2015, the album was released on vinyl as part of an eight-disc, limited-edition vinyl box set titled The Collection.

Track listing
Intro/"Addicted"
"Just Friends"
"Cherry"
"Back to Black"
"Wake Up Alone"
"Tears Dry on Their Own"
"He Can Only Hold Her"/"Doo Wop (That Thing)"
"Fuck Me Pumps"
"Some Unholy War"
"Love Is a Losing Game"
"Valerie"
"Hey Little Rich Girl" (featuring Zalon & Ade)
"Rehab"
"You Know I'm No Good"
"Me & Mr Jones"
"Monkey Man"
Outro

I Told You I Was Trouble documentary
"The Early Years"
"Life in the U.K."
"The U.S. Story"
"Back Home ... The Future"

Personnel
Credits adapted from the liner notes of I Told You I Was Trouble: Live in London.

Musicians

 Amy Winehouse – vocals
 Dale Davis – musical direction, bass
 Zalon Thompson – background vocals
 Ade Omotayo – background vocals
 Robin Banerjee – guitar
 Nathan Alan – drums
 Xantoné Blacq – keys
 Henry Collins – trumpet
 James Hunt – alto saxophone
 Frank Walden – baritone saxophone

Technical
 Mike Mooney – executive production
 Ray Still – executive production
 Julie Jakobed – executive production
 Melanie Vaughton – production
 Hamish Hamilton – direction

Documentary
 John Turner – editing
 Mike Mooney – executive production
 Joe Kane – production

Artwork
 Chris Christoforou – cover photography, inlay photography
 Jack Barnes – inlay photography
 Alex Hutchinson – design

Charts

Weekly charts

Year-end charts

Certifications

Release history

References

2007 live albums
2007 video albums
Amy Winehouse live albums
Amy Winehouse video albums
Island Records live albums
Island Records video albums
Live video albums